The Dictator is a 1922 American silent comedy-drama film produced by Famous Players-Lasky and distributed through Paramount Pictures. James Cruze was the director and the star Wallace Reid.

The basic story had also been filmed in 1915 with John Barrymore who had played a supporting part in the 1904 Broadway starring production of comedian William Collier. Both this film and the 1915 version are now lost.

Cast
Wallace Reid as Brooke Travers
Theodore Kosloff as Carlos Rivas
Lila Lee as Juanita
Kalla Pasha as General Campos
Sidney Bracey as Henry Bolton
Fred J. Butler as Sam Travers (credited as Fred Butler)
Walter Long as Mike 'Bigg' Dooley
Alan Hale as Sabos

See also
Wallace Reid filmography

References

External links

The AFI Catalog of Feature Films:The Dictator

The Dictator Swedish language release poster as Revolutionen i Costa Banana
American lobby poster (archived)

1922 films
American silent feature films
Lost American films
Films directed by James Cruze
Paramount Pictures films
Famous Players-Lasky films
1922 comedy-drama films
1920s English-language films
American black-and-white films
Films set in South America
American films based on plays
Remakes of American films
Lost comedy-drama films
1922 lost films
1920s American films
Silent American comedy-drama films